The 2018 South Carolina State Bulldogs football team represented South Carolina State University in the 2018 NCAA Division I FCS football season. They were led by 17th-year head coach Oliver Pough and played their home games at Oliver C. Dawson Stadium. They were a member of the Mid-Eastern Athletic Conference (MEAC). They finished the season 5–6, 4–3 in MEAC play to finish in a tie for fourth place.

Previous season
The Bulldogs finished the 2017 season 3–7, 2–6 in MEAC play to finish in a three-way tie for eighth place.

Preseason

MEAC preseason poll
In a vote of the MEAC head coaches and sports information directors, the Bulldogs were picked to finish in seventh place.

Preseason All-MEAC Teams
The Tigers had four players selected to the preseason all-MEAC teams.

Defense

2nd team

Damu Ford – LB

3rd team

Kendrick Gathers – DB

Alex Brown – DB

Special teams

3rd team

Clifford Benjamin, Jr. – P

Schedule

Source: Schedule

Despite also being members of the MEAC, games against Florida A&M and Norfolk State will be considered non-conference games and will not have an effect on the MEAC standings.

Game summaries

at Georgia Southern

at UCF

Norfolk State

at North Carolina A&T

at Morgan State

Bethune–Cookman

Delaware State

at Howard

at Florida A&M

Savannah State

North Carolina Central

References

South Carolina State
South Carolina State Bulldogs football seasons
South Carolina State Bulldogs football